The 2011 Colonial Athletic Association men's soccer season was the 29th season of men's college soccer in the Colonial Athletic Association, played from August 25, 2011 until November 3, 2011. The season marked the first time in 11 years that the James Madison Dukes won the regular season title, amassing a conference record of 8–3–0, with a 12–4–1 overall record. The regular season culminated with the tournament, which was won by the Delaware Blue Hens, making it their first conference championship in 40 years.

Four teams qualified for the NCAA Division I Men's Soccer Championship, making it the largest representation by the conference in the tournament's history. Delaware automatically qualified for the tournament through winning the conference tournament, while James Madison, Old Dominion and Georgia State all entered the tournament via at-large berths. These three teams were the finalists and semifinalists in the CAA Tournament.

Colleges

Head coaching changes 

There were no head coaching changes during the 2010–11 offseason.

Preseason

Coaches poll

Standings

Tournament 

The tournament will be hosted by whoever wins the regular season title. Right now, either James Madison or Old Dominion will host the tournament, depending on their regular season outcomes.

Results

Top goalscorers

Last updated: October 31, 2011Source: NMN Athletics

See also 
Colonial Athletic Association
2011 CAA Men's Soccer Tournament
2011 NCAA Division I men's soccer season
2011 NCAA Division I Men's Soccer Championship

References